Guyuk may refer to:
Guyuk, Nigeria, a town
Uğurtaş, a town in Turkey, formerly called Güyük
Güyük Khan (c. 1206–1248), the Great Khan of the Mongol Empire